Raiders of San Joaquin is a 1943 American Western film directed by Lewis D. Collins and written by Elmer Clifton and Morgan Cox. The film stars Johnny Mack Brown, Tex Ritter, Fuzzy Knight, Jennifer Holt, Henry Hall and Joseph E. Bernard. The film was released on May 1, 1943, by Universal Pictures.

Plot

Cast         
Johnny Mack Brown as Rocky Morgan 
Tex Ritter as Gil Blake
Fuzzy Knight as Eustace Clairmont
Jennifer Holt as Jane Carter
Henry Hall as Bodine Carter
Joseph E. Bernard as Jim Blake 
George Eldredge as Gus Sloan
Henry Roquemore as John Rogers
John Elliott as Morgan
Michael Vallon as Clark
Jack O'Shea as Detective
Jack Ingram as Lear
Robert Thompson as Johnson
Carl Sepulveda as Tanner
Scoop Martin as Tripp
Roy Brent as McQuarry
Budd Buster as Deputy

References

External links
 

1943 films
1940s English-language films
American Western (genre) films
1943 Western (genre) films
Universal Pictures films
Films directed by Lewis D. Collins
American black-and-white films
1940s American films